Noah Söderberg (born 21 August 2001) is a Swedish football midfielder who plays for Elfsborg.

References

2001 births
Living people
Swedish footballers
Association football midfielders
IF Elfsborg players
Allsvenskan players